Frutos is a surname. Notable people with the surname include:

Alexandre Frutos, French football player
Alexis Frutos Vaesken, Paraguayan diplomat
Francisco Frutos, Spanish politician
Javier de Frutos, Venezuelan choreographer
Juan Manuel Frutos, President of Paraguay
Nicanor Duarte Frutos, President of Paraguay
Nicolás Frutos, Argentine football player
Pilar Frutos, Paraguayan team handball player